Rainbow Visions is the fifth album by R&B group Side Effect. Released in 1978, this was their fourth and final album for Fantasy Records.

Track listing
Peace of Mind 	4:35 	
Disco Junction 	3:30 	
She's a Lady 	4:07 	
Illee, Illee, Oh I Know 	6:45 	
Rainbow Visions 	4:10 	
Falling in Love Again 	3:45 	
I Like Dreaming 	4:38 	
I'm a Winner 	4:10

Charts

External links
 Side Effect-Rainbow Visions at Discogs

References

1978 albums
Side Effect albums
Fantasy Records albums
Albums recorded at Total Experience Recording Studios
Albums produced by Wayne Henderson (musician)